Mohammed Al-Zakrouti (Arabic:محمد الزكروطي) (born 19 May 1996) is a Qatari footballer.

External links
 

Qatari footballers
1996 births
Living people
Qatar Stars League players
Qatari Second Division players
Al-Wakrah SC players
Association football midfielders